The following is a list of all IFT-licensed over-the-air television stations broadcasting in the Mexican state of Baja California. The state of Baja California has 25 operating digital television stations.

List of television stations

|-

|-

|-

|-

|-

|-

|-

|-

|-

|-

|-

|-

|-

|-

|-

|-

|-

|-

|-

|-

|-

|-

|-

|-

|-

|-

|-

|-

|-

References

Television stations in Baja California
Baja California